Franz Wolf may refer to:

Franz Wolf (SS officer) (1907–?), German Nazi senior squad leader
Franz Wolf (canoeist) (born 1938), Austrian sprint canoer